Caesia is a monotypic genus of sea snails in the subfamily Nassariinae of the family Nassariidae.

Species
 Caesia perpinguis (Hinds, 1844)

 Synonyms
 Caesia japonica (A. Adams, 1852): synonym of Nassarius praematuratus (Kuroda & Habe in Habe, 1960)

References

External links
 Adams, H. & Adams, A. (1853-1858). The genera of Recent Mollusca; arranged according to their organization. London, van Voorst.
 Galindo, L. A.; Puillandre, N.; Utge, J.; Lozouet, P.; Bouchet, P. (2016). The phylogeny and systematics of the Nassariidae revisited (Gastropoda, Buccinoidea). Molecular Phylogenetics and Evolution. 99: 337-353

Nassariidae